WJDX (620 kHz) is an AM radio station licensed to serve Jackson, Mississippi.  The station is owned by iHeartMedia, Inc. (formerly Clear Channel Communications until September 2014) and licensed to iHM Licenses, LLC.  It airs a news/talk/sports format.

Mississippi Sports This Morning, which is now airing on WJQS is the station's flagship local program. It aired during WJDX's morning drive slot without interruption from 1998 to 2020. It is currently hosted by Doug Colson and Jay White. It is the longest running daily sports talk program in Mississippi radio history.

WJDX also serves as the Jackson home for the New Orleans Saints and NASCAR.

The station was assigned the current WJDX call letters by the Federal Communications Commission on October 9, 1998.  According to the FCC, the call letters were WJDS from July 6, 1990 to October 8, 1998.  Prior to July 6, 1990 the call letters were WJDX for several years.

On October 3, 2011 WJDX changed their format to news/talk.

In the 1970s and early 1980s, WJDX was a successful Top 40 music station.  Prior to that the station had been a conservative MOR music outlet.

Previous logo

References

Skeeter (Eugenia Phelan) describes listening to Patsy Cline's « Walking After Midnight » followed by « Three Cigarettes in an Ashtray » on WJDX radio in the Cadillac after her first interview with Aibileen in Kathryn Stockett's novel ‘The Help’.

External links
WJDX official website

News and talk radio stations in the United States
IHeartMedia radio stations
JDX (AM)